This list is of the  (GIAHS), as designated by the Food and Agriculture Organization (FAO), and  (JNIAHS), as designated by the Ministry of Agriculture, Forestry and Fisheries (MAFF), in Japan.

Globally Important Agricultural Heritage Systems
As of June 2022, there are 11 designated Globally Important Agricultural Heritage Systems in Japan.

Proposed systems
As of June 2022, six systems have been proposed for future designation.

Japanese Nationally Important Agricultural Heritage Systems
In addition to the three GIAHS above that are also JNIAHS, and the six JNIAHS above that have been put forward for designation as GIAHS, as of June 2022, thirteen systems have been designated.

Other agricultural heritage initiatives

See also
 Cultural Landscape (Japan)
 100 Terraced Rice Fields of Japan
 100 Fishing Village Heritage Sites (Japan)

References

External links
   Globally Important Agricultural Heritage Systems (FAO)
  Globally & Japanese Nationally Important Agricultural Heritage Systems (MAFF)

Agriculture in Japan
Economic history of Japan
Environment of Japan
Japanese culture
Globally Important Agricultural Heritage Systems